Mukim Sungai Kluang or Sungai Keluang (also known as Mukim 12) is a mukim (Malay for subdistrict) located in Batu Pahat District in Johor, Malaysia. Batu Pahat District was divided into 14 mukims, each of which encompasses several villages. The population was 16,591 in 2010. The majority ethics of the population in the Sungai Kluang is Malay (11,854). It border with Mukim Benut, Pontian District in east and Mukim Sungai Punggor in west.

Settlement 
Mukim Sungai Kluang comprises the following populated village, among them are:

 Kampung Belahan Tampok Laut
 Kampung Belahan Tampok
 Kampung Parit Tengah Seri Merlong
 Kampung Parit Tengah Seri Aman
 Kampung Parit Haji Siraj
 Kampung Sungai Merlong
 Kampung Seri Merlong
 Kampung Parit Wak Kawik
 Kampung Parit Haji Noor
 Kampung Sungai Bagan
 Kampung Sungai Bagan Laut
 Kampung Sungai Bagan Darat
 Kampung Parit Daeng Machening
 Kampung Sungai Jambi
 Kampung Sungai Jambi Laut
 Kampung Sungai Jambi Darat
 Kampung Sungai Kluang Laut
 Kampung Sungai Kluang Darat
 Kampung Parit Jalal
 Kampung Parit Latiff
 Kampung Kuala Sungai Rengit
 Kampung Parit Amat
 Kampung Parit Sarpan
 Kampung Parit No. Satu Rengit
 Kampung Parit Masjid
 Kampung Parit Seri Borhan
 Kampung Parit Lapis Seri Borhan
 Kampung Parit Korea Selatan
 Kampung Rengit Laut
 Kampung Parit Lapis
 Kampung Parit Tengah Seri Ladang
 Kampung Parit Besar
 Kampung Parit Gantung
 Kampung Parit Lapis Gantung

The mukim also encompasses the town and housing area:

 Bandar Rengit
 Taman Pandan Jaya 1
 Taman Kavang Muhibbah
 Taman Ria
 Taman Ria Dua/2
 Taman Seri Damai
 Taman Dato Jalal
 Taman Jasa Amir

References 

Mukims of Batu Pahat District